"Dancing Junk" is a song by Super Monkey's 4, released in 1993 as their first single under their new name. The B-side, "Rainbow Moon", is a solo song by the group's lead singer, Namie Amuro. It was her first of many during her time with the group.
"Dancing Junk" was used as the first ending theme to the anime series Nintama Rantarou.

Track listing
 "Dancing Junk" (Masao Urino, Koji Magaino) - 4:38
 "Rainbow Moon" (Masao Urino, Koji Magaino) - 4:18
 "Dancing Junk" (Original Karaoke)" (Koji Magaino) - 4:38
 "Rainbow Moon" (Original Karaoke)" (Koji Magaino) - 4:14

Personnel
Namie Amuro - vocals, background vocals
Hisako Arakaki - background vocals
Minako Ameku - background vocals
Nanako Takushi - background vocals

Charts
Oricon Sales Chart (Japan)

1993 singles
Super Monkey's songs
1993 songs
Nintama Rantarō